is a Japanese singer and actor who is represented by the talent agency, K-Dash.

Filmography

TV series

Films

Video games

Awards

References

External links
  
 Official profile 

Japanese male actors
Japanese male singers
1964 births
Living people
People from Yokohama
Musicians from Kanagawa Prefecture